The Museums at Washington and Chapin are several museums that share a campus in South Bend, Indiana. The name is derived from the location, at the corner of Washington Street and Chapin Street in South Bend. Both museums have one common entrance off Thomas Street, one block south of Washington Street. The museums currently include the History Museum and Studebaker National Museum.

External links
Studebaker National Museum
The History Museum

Museum organizations
Museums in South Bend, Indiana